Super Queeroes is a Canadian multimedia web project, which launched in 2019 on CBC Arts. Created as a Pride Month project to mark the 50th anniversary of the Stonewall Riots, the project featured LGBTQ Canadians creating short video, essay or art projects in tribute to another influential LGBTQ Canadian trailblazer. It was conceived by writer and producer Peter Knegt.

The project selected a total of 69 honorees because Stonewall had taken place in 1969; seven of the honorees were duos or groups, but were counted as a single honoree because they were being named collectively rather than as individuals.

The project won the Canadian Screen Award for Best Interactive Production at the 8th Canadian Screen Awards in 2020.

Honoured figures

An additional article published at the end of the project also highlighted a number of other figures who were worthy of inclusion in the project despite having not been among the chosen honorees, including Trey Anthony, Brandon Ash-Mohammed, Wayne Baerwaldt, Billy-Ray Belcourt, Paul Bellini, Bif Naked, Heather Bishop, Deanna Bowen, Martha Chaves, Meryn Cadell, Brent Carver, Cœur de pirate, Keith Cole, Douglas Coupland, Susan G. Cole, Toller Cranston, Thirza Cuthand, Amber Dawn, Emma Donoghue, Michelle DuBarry, Stephen Dunn, Ali Eisner, Brendan Fernandes, Ferron, Brad Fraser, Christopher Gillis, Rex Harrington, John Herbert, René Highway, Ahasiw Maskegon-Iskwew, iskwē, Adam Garnet Jones, Chase Joynt, Ladyfag, Zachari Logan, Ashley MacIsaac, Norman McLaren, Rick Mercer, Louis Negin, Charles Pachter, Evalyn Parry, Jean-Pierre Perreault, Ed Pien, Casey Plett, Jaik Puppyteeth, David Rakoff, Tedd Robinson, Walter K. Scott, Tommy Sexton, Rowan Sky, Scott Symons, Kai Cheng Thom, Tanja Tiziana, Scott Treleaven, Gary Varro, Joshua Whitehead, Zoe Whittall, Patricia Wilson and d'bi Young.

References

External links

2019 web series debuts
Canadian LGBT-related web series
Canadian Screen Award winners